Amor seco (Spanish: dry love) is a common name for several plants and may refer to:

 Alchornea glandulosa,  a tree species of the Acalyphoideae
 Bidens pilosa, an annual herb species in the family Asteraceae
 Chrysopogon aciculatus, a grass species